Astal is a 2D side scrolling platform game for the Sega Saturn. Astal was released early in the Sega Saturn's life and used hand-drawn graphics. The animations for the cutscenes were provided by TMS Entertainment.

Gameplay
Astal is a 2D side-scrolling platform game. The player must guide the title character through the course of a level while avoiding or eliminating obstacles and opposing forces. In addition to running and jumping, different button combinations allow for punching or throwing enemies. The ground can be punched to stun opposing enemies nearby, and a blowing attack can be charged by inhaling and exhaling, which blows enemies or obstacles away from the character. Certain parts of the level's environment, such as trees or rocks, can also be picked up and thrown. Defeating special glowing enemies charges up a meter that allows for the use of a bird character who assists the player. A limited asymmetrical co-op mode includes a second player controlling the bird characters action, which includes wing attacks and divebombing.

Plot
Somewhere in the universe, the Goddess Antowas created a world from a single jewel. On this world, Quartalia, she created the sky, earth, and air. To inhabit this world, she created two humans: from a green jewel, a girl, Leda, who has the power to make things live on Quartalia; and from a red Jewel, a boy, Astal, whose purpose was to protect Leda. Content with her creation, Antowas slept.

While she slept, the evil Jerado tried to take over Quartalia. To ensure victory, Jerado created a warrior: Geist. Geist kidnapped Leda, and held her at the bottom of the ocean. In an effort to get her back, Astal tore Quartalia apart, awakening Antowas. As punishment, Antowas banished Astal to Quartalia's moon. Leda took pity on Astal, and gave him her jewel. Once Astal and Jerado were dealt with, Antowas went back to sleep.

However, Geist was still free, and Quartalia was not restored from the changes Jerado wrought. From his prison on the moon, Astal witnessed Geist kidnap Leda again. Consumed with the need to protect her, he freed himself and returned to Quartalia. Now Astal journeys in search of Leda through a Quartalia transformed by Jerado's dark design, along with a strange bird who for some reason just won't leave him alone...

Localization
The game had a number of differences between its Japanese and English language releases. In the Japanese version, Astal has five life points and unlimited continues. This was dropped to three life points and one continue in the North American version. In the Japanese version, the song "Let Me Try Again" that plays during the game's intro movie includes vocals. The North American version is instrumental. However, the vocal version can be heard by playing the game's CD in a standard CD player.

The Japanese voice cast had the titular character being voiced by Ai Orikasa, Leda, Yuri Shiratori, with Antowas and the Narrator being played by Aya Hisakawa, Geist being played by Ryo Horikawa, and Jerado, Daisuke Gōri. The monsters were voiced by Saori Wada, Toshiyasu Kamiko, Naoko Hamada, and Yasumaru Hotta. All voices in the North American version are performed by Lani Minella, who has voiced many different video game characters in her career, including Rouge the Bat and Omochao in Sega's Sonic Adventure 2 and Sonic Heroes.

Reception
On release, Famicom Tsūshin scored Astal 24 out of 40. GamePro criticized the game's visual aesthetic, saying that "The beautifully drawn graphics are charming, but unfortunately they're charming in the style of those round-eyed-waif paintings." The reviewer added that the challenge would be too frustrating for children, and that the short stages leave the game with little longevity. He concluded that while it "strengthens the Saturn's platform potential", Astal is merely "A good rental". Electric Playground gave it 8 out of 10. Jennifer Diane Reitz reviewed the game positively but criticized it for being too short and having a limited number of actions available to players. Reitz summarized Astal as "Exquisitely beautiful, lovely, wonderful fare. It is too short... but Astal is one hell of a ride while it lasts. A rare, but slightly flawed gem." Next Generation rated it three stars out of five, and stated that "Astal is, in the end, a fine, side-scrolling action game, and if you already own a Saturn and you love side-scrolling action games, then this is a good one to pursue, but this game would not exactly make a good argument for buying a 32-bit machine."

IGN staff writer Levi Buchanan ranked Astal ninth in his list of the top 10 Sega Saturn games, noting that "The game came out early in the Saturn's lifespan and was largely ignored -- no thanks to the garish box art. But those that did take Astal home cherished this beautiful example of a fading genre." However, another IGN writer gave it a 3 out of 10 and called it "crappy" and "derivative" albeit with "pretty graphics".

Legacy
Astal often makes cameo appearances in the Sonic The Hedgehog comic book series by Archie Comics, courtesy of artist Patrick Spaziante. Astal (and the bird) have a one panel cameo in Sonic the Hedgehog issue #50. They appear alongside Bark the Polar Bear, Bean the Dynamite, Ray the Flying Squirrel, Ristar, and Deku from Fighters Megamix fighting against the Overlanders (Humans) in a flashback/dream sequence of Dr. Robotnik. On the cover of #51, Astal appears in the audience, looking up to Sonic, Tails, and Princess Sally standing on the podium and celebrating their victory over Dr. Robotnik. On the cover of #125, he is behind the "5" card held by Mighty the Armadillo.

Notes

References

1995 video games
Platform games
Sega video games
Sega Saturn games
Sega Saturn-only games
Multiplayer and single-player video games
Video games developed in Japan